Entephria bradorata is a species of geometrid moth in the family Geometridae. It is found in North America.

The MONA or Hodges number for Entephria bradorata is 7300.2.

References

Further reading

 
 
 

Hydriomenini
Articles created by Qbugbot
Moths described in 1951